Louise Elisabeth Andrae (3 August 1876, Leipzig – 1945, Dresden) was a German Post-Impressionist landscape painter and watercolorist.

Biography 
She studied with two landscape painters;  in Dresden and Hans von Volkmann in Karlsruhe. She settled in Dresden, but spent long periods on the island of Hiddensee.

They were regular exhibitors at an art venue known as the Blaue Scheune (Blue Barn), established in 1920 by Henni Lehmann. She also exhibited frequently with a group known as the "Kunstkaten" in Ahrenshoop.

Her brother was the archaeologist Walter Andrae, Curator and Director of the Vorderasiatisches Museum in Berlin. After 1930, she assisted him by painting large murals of several excavation sites in Babylon, Assur, Uruk and Yazılıkaya; two of which may still be seen at the museum.

Her works remained very popular during the Nazi years. She died at an unknown date in 1945, probably as a result of the bombing of Dresden or its aftermath.

References

Further reading 
 Ruth Negendanck: Hiddensee: die besondere Insel für Künstler. Edition Fischerhuder Kunstbuch 2005, S. 83-85
 Angela Rapp: Der Hiddensoer Künstlerinnenbund - Malweiber sind wir nicht, Berlin 2012,

External links 

 ArtNet: More works by Andrae.
 Elisabeth Andrae @ Der Hiddensoer Künstlerinnenbund

1876 births
1945 deaths
20th-century German painters
German landscape painters
German watercolourists
German women painters
Artists from Leipzig
20th-century German women artists
Deaths by airstrike during World War II
German civilians killed in World War II
Women watercolorists